Plasmodium lutzi is a parasite of the genus Plasmodium subgenus Haemamoeba.

Like all Plasmodium species P. lutzi has both vertebrate and insect hosts. The vertebrate hosts for this parasite are birds.

Taxonomy 
The parasite was first described by Lucena in 1939.

Distribution
This parasite is found in Brazil, Colombia and Venezuela.

Hosts
This parasite has been reported to infect the grey-cowled wood rail (Aramides cajaneus) and the great thrush (Turdus fuscater).

References 

lutzi
Parasites of birds